Soyuz TM-6 was a crewed Soyuz spaceflight to Mir. It was launched on 29 August 1988, at 04:23:11 UTC, for the station's third long-duration expedition, Mir EO-3. The three-person crew that was launched consisted of Research Doctor Valeri Polyakov, who became part of the EO-3 crew, as well as the two crew members of the week-long mission Mir EP-3, which included the first ever Afghan cosmonaut, Abdul Ahad Mohmand.

On September 8, Soyuz TM-6 was undocked from Mirs Kvant port and redocked onto the Mir Base Block's port. It remained there until December, when it brought Titov and Manarov of the EO-3 crew back to Earth. It also landed French astronaut Jean-Loup Chrétien, ending his 25-day-long spaceflight which started with Soyuz TM-7.

Crew

Valeri Polyakov remained behind on Mir with cosmonauts Musa Manarov and Vladimir Titov when Mohmand and Lyakhov returned to Earth in Soyuz TM-5.

The crew of Soyuz TM-6 had a unique makeup, with a commander (Vladimir Lyakhov) who had been trained to fly a Soyuz-TM solo in the event a rescue ship needed to be sent to recover two cosmonauts from Mir, no flight engineer, and two inexperienced cosmonaut-researchers. One was Valeri Polyakov, who would remain aboard Mir with Titov and Manarov to monitor their health during the final months of their planned year-long stay. The other was Intercosmos cosmonaut Abdul Ahad Mohmand, from Afghanistan.

Mission parametersMass: 7070 kgPerigee: 195 kmApogee: 228 kmInclination: 51.6°Period:' 88.7 minutes

References

Afghanistan–Soviet Union relations
Crewed Soyuz missions
1988 in Afghanistan
1988 in the Soviet Union
Spacecraft launched in 1988